Sex and the City is an American premium television comedy-drama   created by Darren Star. It is an adaptation of the book of the same name written by Candace Bushnell. The show was produced by Darren Star Productions, HBO Original Programming and Warner Bros. Television. The series chronicles the life of Carrie Bradshaw (Sarah Jessica Parker), a sex columnist for the fictional New York Star who explores the world of sex while living in New York City to gather material for her column "Sex and the City". The show also chronicles her relationships with friends Miranda Hobbes (Cynthia Nixon), Samantha Jones (Kim Cattrall) and Charlotte York (Kristin Davis).

Sex and the City aired on the premium television channel HBO from June 6, 1998 to February 22, 2004, broadcasting 94 episodes over six seasons during its initial run. During the series run, the series was nominated for 54 Emmy Awards (winning seven, including Outstanding Comedy Series), 24 Golden Globe Awards (winning eight, including Best Television Series – Musical or Comedy), 11 Screen Actors Guild Awards (winning 3), 10 Directors Guild of America Awards (winning two), 7 Satellite Awards (winning two for Best Television Series – Musical or Comedy), and 4 Producers Guild of America Awards (winning 3). The series garnered various other awards and nominations, recognizing aspects such as directing, producing, casting, and costumes.

Sarah Jessica Parker was nominated for 32 individual awards for her role as Carrie Bradshaw, as well as executive producer of the series, receiving the Emmy Award for Outstanding Lead Actress in a Comedy Series, the Emmy Award for Outstanding comedy series as executive producer, 4 Golden Globe awards for Best Actress – Television Series Musical or Comedy, a SAG Award for Outstanding Performance by a Female Actor in a Comedy Series and two SAG awards for Outstanding Performance by an Ensemble in a Comedy series. Kim Cattrall received 17 award nominations for her role in the series, winning the Golden Globe Award for Best Supporting Actress – Series, Miniseries or Television Film. The series has been nominated for 210 awards, and has won 55.

Awards and nominations

American Cinema Editors Awards

American Comedy Awards

AFI Awards

BMI Film & TV Awards

British Comedy Awards

CINE Golden Eagle Awards

Costume Designers Guild

The Costume Designers Guild Award is an annual accolade presented by the Costume Designers Guild, recognizing outstanding achievements by costume designers in film, television and commercials. Costume designer Patricia Field received six nominations for the award for Best Costume Design – Contemporary TV Series, winning four times.

Directors Guild of America Awards
The Directors Guild of America Award is an annual accolade presented by the Directors Guild of America, recognizing outstanding achievements in film and television directing, since 1938. Sex and the City has won the award for Outstanding Directing – Comedy Series twice, both for work by Tim Van Patten.

Emmy Awards
In its run, Sex and the City has been nominated for 54 awards. Of those awards, the series has won seven of them, including the award for Outstanding Comedy Series in 2001, Outstanding Directing for a Comedy Series twice in 2002 and 2003, and Outstanding Casting for a Comedy Series twice in 2002 and 2003. Sarah Jessica Parker received a nomination for Outstanding Lead Actress in a Comedy Series every year between 1999 and 2004, winning in 2004. That same year, Cynthia Nixon won the award for Outstanding Supporting Actress in a Comedy Series, after being nominated three times in the past.

Primetime Emmy Awards

Creative Arts Emmy Awards

GLAAD Media Awards

Golden Globe Awards

The Golden Globe Award is an annual accolade bestowed by members of the Hollywood Foreign Press Association recognizing outstanding achievements in film and television. Sex and the City received 24 award nominations, winning eight of them, including the award for Best Television Series – Musical or Comedy from 2000-2002.

Golden Reel Awards

Gracie Awards

Online Film & Television Association

Prism Awards

Producers Guild Golden Laurel Awards (PGA)

Satellite Awards

Screen Actors Guild Awards

Television Critics Association Awards

Writers Guild of America (WGA)

Other awards

References

Sex and the City
Lists of awards by television series